Hangklip Sand Fynbos is an endangered vegetation type that occurs in the southern coastal portion of the Western Cape, South Africa. 

This particular fynbos ecosystem naturally occurs along the southern coast of the Western Cape, South Africa, between Agulhas and Pringle Bay. There is also an isolated remnant of it far to the west in the Fish Hoek Valley on the Cape Peninsula, Cape Town.

See also
 Biodiversity of Cape Town
 Fish Hoek Valley
 Cape Flats Sand Fynbos
 Atlantis Sand Fynbos
 Cape Floristic Region
 Index: Fynbos - habitats and species.

References

Fynbos ecosystems
.
Vegetation types of Cape Town